Tramitichromis is a small genus of haplochromine cichlids endemic to Lake Malawi.

Species
There are currently five recognized species in this genus:
 Tramitichromis brevis (Boulenger, 1908)
 Tramitichromis intermedius (Trewavas, 1935)
 Tramitichromis lituris (Trewavas, 1931)
 Tramitichromis trilineatus (Trewavas, 1931)
 Tramitichromis variabilis (Trewavas, 1931)

References

 
Haplochromini

Cichlid genera
Taxa named by Ethelwynn Trewavas
Taxonomy articles created by Polbot